Frank W. Yandrisevits (born September 12, 1954) is a former Democratic member of the Pennsylvania House of Representatives.

References

Members of the Pennsylvania House of Representatives
Living people
1954 births
People from Northampton, Pennsylvania